Ondo West is a Local Government Area in Ondo State, Nigeria. Its headquarters are in the town of Ondo.

It has an area of 970 km and a population of 283,672 at the 2006 census.

The postal code of the area is 351.

There are four higher institutions in Ondo West: Adeyemi College of Education established in 1964 by the Federal Government of Nigeria and recently upgraded to a Federal University of Education;  National Institute for Educational Planning and Administration (NIEPA) established in 1992 by the Federal Government; Wesley University established in 2008 by the Methodist Church, Nigeria; and the University of Medical Sciences, Ondo established by the Ondo State Government in 2015 to train medical and health professionals.

References

Local Government Areas in Ondo State